Marinomonas pontica is a Gram-negative bacterium from the genus of Marinomonas which has been isolated from sea water from the Black Sea in the Ukraine.

References

Oceanospirillales
Bacteria described in 2005